Harmsworth is a surname, and may refer to:

 Alfred Harmsworth (barrister) (1837–1889), British lawyer
 Alfred Harmsworth, 1st Viscount Northcliffe (1865–1922), British newspaper and publishing magnate
 Cecil Harmsworth, 1st Baron Harmsworth (18691948), British businessman and Liberal politician
 Esmond Harmsworth, 2nd Viscount Rothermere (1898–1978), British Conservative politician and press magnate
 Fred Harmsworth (born 1877), English footballer 
 Harold Harmsworth, 1st Viscount Rothermere (1868–1940), British newspaper proprietor
 Hildebrand Harmsworth (1872–1929), British newspaper proprietor
 Hildebrand Alfred Beresford Harmsworth (1901–1977), rentier
 Jonathan Harmsworth, 4th Viscount Rothermere (born 1967), British media man
 Leicester Harmsworth (1870–1937), British businessman and Liberal politician
 Mark Harmsworth, American politician
 Mary Harmsworth, Viscountess Northcliffe (1867–1963)
 Patricia Harmsworth, Viscountess Rothermere (1929–1992), English socialite and actress
 Paul Harmsworth (born 1963), British sprinter
 St John Harmsworth (1876–1933), English businessman 
 Vere Harmsworth, 3rd Viscount Rothermere (1925–1998), British newspaper man

See also
 Harmsworth (disambiguation)